Krista Allen (born April 5, 1971) is an American actress, model and stand-up comic. She is best known for her work in the television series Days of Our Lives, Baywatch Hawaii, and the erotic TV series Emmanuelle in Space. Allen also appeared in the films Liar Liar, Confessions of a Dangerous Mind, Anger Management, and The Final Destination. She guest-starred in popular TV shows Married... with Children, The X-Files, Charmed, Smallville, and Two and a Half Men. She also portrayed the eponymous character on The CW series Significant Mother. In December 2021, Allen began playing the contract role of Taylor Hayes on the CBS Daytime soap opera The Bold and the Beautiful.

Early life
Krista Allen was born in Ventura, California, on April 5, 1971. She grew up in Houston and later lived in Austin, Texas. Allen is a certified yoga instructor.

Career
In 1994, Allen portrayed the lead character Emmanuelle in the erotic movie series Emmanuelle in Space.
She appeared on the television shows Days of Our Lives in the role of Billie Reed from 1996 to 1999, and Baywatch Hawaii as Jenna Avid (2000–2001).
Allen played a sexy virtual-reality character Maitreya/Jade Blue Afterglow in an episode of The X-Files, and made a memorable appearance as the busty Elevator Girl in the Jim Carrey comedy Liar Liar.

In 2002, Allen appeared in an episode of Friends, "The One Where Joey Dates Rachel" as Joey's girlfriend Mable. In 2005, she appeared in the short-lived Fox sitcom Head Cases. In both Smallville and Mutant X, Allen played a woman who could control men with her pheromones. In 2001, she guest-starred in the supernatural TV series Charmed as "The Oracle" for three episodes. She also appeared in Toby Keith's video "A Little Too Late", and had a small role in CSI: Crime Scene Investigation as Kristy Hopkins, a hooker who caught the eye of Nick Stokes, in the pilot episode on October 6, 2000. She returned later in two more episodes during the first season.

In 2002, Allen had a role in Confessions of a Dangerous Mind. In 2003, she had a role in an entertaining episode of Gene Roddenbery's Andromeda, "The Illusion of Majesty", playing a con artist who impersonates both a princess and a goddess. In 2005, she was one of the stars of HBO's Unscripted, playing herself as an actress who struggles to overcome her sex symbol status in order to win more serious roles.
Allen had a recurring role on the ABC series What About Brian as Bridget, a reluctant but potential love interest for the main character Brian, played by Barry Watson.

In 2007, Allen appeared in the ABC reality television series Fast Cars and Superstars: The Gillette Young Guns Celebrity Race, featuring a dozen celebrities in a stock-car racing competition.  In the first round, she matched up against skateboarder Tony Hawk and rodeo champion Ty Murray. Allen appeared on the second season of Denise Richards: It's Complicated, which premiered on June 7, 2009.  Allen also appeared on an episode of NBC's Love Bites in 2011.

In August 2015, Allen began appearing as Lydia Marlowe on The CW series Significant Mother.
Allen was featured in Maxim magazine's Girls of Maxim gallery, and was named number 70 on the Maxim "Hot 100 of 2005" list.
Allen had a T-shirt line called Superexcellent for several years.

In December 2021, Allen made her soap opera comeback when she began airing as the recast of Taylor Hayes on the long running daytime soap opera The Bold and the Beautiful which was previously portrayed by Hunter Tylo.

Personal life
Allen is a vegan.

On September 14, 1996, Allen married Justin Moritt, a production manager. She gave birth to a son named Jacob "Jake" Nolan Moritt on July 12, 1997. The couple divorced in 1999. She dated George Clooney for two years after meeting him on the set of Confessions of a Dangerous Mind in 2002.

On October 10, 2010, Allen married Mams Taylor, a British rapper. They separated in April 2011 and Allen filed for divorce at Los Angeles County Superior Court on February 12, 2012. On November 15, 2015, it was reported that Allen was dating actor Nathan Fillion. However the two broke up in 2020.

Filmography

Film

Television

References

External links

 
 
 
 Official Veggie Boom Boom website 
 "Krista Allen".Stuff. December 2003.
 

Living people
Actresses from California
Actresses from Houston
American film actresses
American soap opera actresses
American television actresses
University of Texas alumni
Actresses from Austin, Texas
People from Ventura, California
American people of Dutch descent
American people of English descent
American people of Portuguese descent
20th-century American actresses
21st-century American actresses
Emmanuelle in Space
1971 births